Never Forget is a 1991 American made-for-television drama film starring Leonard Nimoy and directed by Joseph Sargent. It originally aired April 8, 1991 on TNT.

Plot
Mr. Mermelstein (Leonard Nimoy) and Mrs. Mermelstein (Blythe Danner) are a true-life California couple thrown into the spotlight of judicial history in the 1980s. He is a Hungarian-born Jew, sole survivor of his family's extermination at Auschwitz, and she is a Southern Baptist from Tennessee. Their four children are good kids, typical Americans, with just enough orneriness to irritate each other, but enough love and class to pull together when it counts. When challenged by a hate group to prove that Jews were actually gassed at Auschwitz, Mel Mermelstein rises to the occasion with the support of his wife and children, in spite of the dangers to himself, his business, and his family. William John Cox (Dabney Coleman) provides legal help (pro bono) as a lawyer, originally a Roman Catholic from Texas.

Cast 
 Leonard Nimoy as Mel Mermelstein
 Blythe Danner as Jane Mermelstein
 Dabney Coleman as William John Cox
 Paul Hampton as Richard Fusilier
 Jason Presson as Bernie Mermelstein
 Juliet Sorci as Edie Mermelstein
 Nicholas Fee as David Mermelstein
 Benji Gregory as Kenny Mermelstein
 David Margulies as Rabbi Hier
 Thomas Bellin as Rabbi Cooper

References 
New York Magazine, April 8, 1991

External links 

1991 television films
1991 films
1991 drama films
1990s English-language films
Films directed by Joseph Sargent
Films scored by Henry Mancini
Films set in California
TNT Network original films
Films about Holocaust denial